A calculator (in the current usage of the word) is an electronic hand-held device that performs mathematical computations.

Calculator may also refer to:
 Calculator (software), a computer program that performs mathematical computations
 Calculator (Windows), a computer program in Microsoft Windows
 Calculator (Apple), a basic calculator application bundled with Apple devices
 Mechanical calculator, a calculating device used from the 1700s to the mid-1900s
 Mental calculator, a person who performs calculations in their head
 Calculator (character), DC Comics villain
 Oxford Calculators, a group of 14th-century philosophers
 Calculator (band), an American emo band
 Richard Swineshead, English mathematician whose popular name was Calculator